Lough Meelagh is a freshwater lake in the northwest of Ireland. It is located in north County Roscommon.

Geography
The Kilronan Castle estate occupies the western shore of the lake.

Natural history
Fish species in Lough Meelagh include perch, roach, pike, and the critically endangered European eel.

See also
List of loughs in Ireland

References

Meelagh